Ghulam Mohiddin Gunga (20 June 1934, in Kabul). He is a former Afghanistan wrestler, who competed at the 1960 Summer Olympic Games in the light-heavyweight freestyle event.

References

External links
 

Wrestlers at the 1962 Asian Games
Wrestlers at the 1960 Summer Olympics
Afghan male sport wrestlers
Olympic wrestlers of Afghanistan
Sportspeople from Kabul
1934 births
Living people
Asian Games competitors for Afghanistan